Luke Ambler (born 18 December 1989) is a former Ireland international rugby league footballer who played in the 2000s and 2010s.

Background
Luke Ambler was born in Halifax, West Yorkshire, England, he has Irish ancestors, and eligible to play for Ireland due to the grandparent rule.

Playing career
Ambler made his full début with the Salford City Reds in August 2008. In December of the same year, following the expiry of his contract with the Salford City Reds, he signed on for a two-year contract with the Leeds Rhinos. He played for Harlequins RL during the 2011 Super League season, and moved to Halifax in 2012. Ambler made his Ireland début against Serbia in 2009. He was named to the Ireland squad for the 2013 Rugby League World Cup. Luke played in the 2014 and 2015 European Cup tournaments. In 2016, he was called up to the Ireland squad for the 2017 Rugby League World Cup European Pool B qualifiers.

Personal life

In the summer of 2016, after the suicide of his brother-in-law, Luke founded Andy's Man Club and has become an ambassador for suicide prevention.

References

External links
Halifax profile
Leeds Rhinos profile
(archived by web.archive.org) Salford City Reds profile

1989 births
Living people
English people of Irish descent
English rugby league players
Halifax R.L.F.C. players
Ireland national rugby league team players
Leeds Rhinos players
London Broncos players
Rugby league locks
Rugby league players from Halifax, West Yorkshire
Rugby league props
Rugby league second-rows
Salford Red Devils players
York City Knights players